Entelodon (meaning "complete teeth", from Ancient Greek  entelēs "complete" and  odōn "tooth", referring to its "complete" eutherian dentition), is an extinct genus of entelodont artiodactyl endemic to Eurasia. Fossils of species are found in Paleogene strata ranging in age from the Houldjinian (37.2–33.9 mya) until the Rupelian epoch of the early Oligocene (33.9–28.4 mya).

Taxonomy
It is one of four entelodont genera native to Eurasia, the other three being the primitive Eoentelodon of late Eocene China, Proentelodon of middle Eocene Mongolia and the gigantic Paraentelodon of mid to late Oligocene Central Asia.

Description
 
Entelodon was a fairly typical entelodont, with a large, bulky body, slender legs, and a long snout.

Like other entelodonts, Entelodon had complete eutherian dentition (3 incisors, 1 canine, 3 premolars, and 3 molars per quadrant). It had only two toes on each foot, and its legs were built for fast running. Its long, wide head was supported by a robust, short neck, and its cheekbones were greatly enlarged and protruded noticeably from the sides of the head. Though it was more closely related to hippos and whales than pigs, its skull was generally pig-like. It is presumed to have been an omnivore.

Paleoecology

Entelodon remains are primarily known from Europe, although fossils have also been found in Kazakhstan, Mongolia, China, and even as far east as Japan.

Entelodon magnus populated a broad swath of Europe, with remains found in Spain, Germany, France, Romania, and the Caucasus. Extensive remains of Entelodon deguilhemi were uncovered in Vayres-sur-Essonne, France. The Chinese Entelodon dirus is known from a single tooth discovered in Nei Mongol.

See also

References

Oligocene even-toed ungulates
Entelodonts
Rupelian genus extinctions
Paleogene mammals of Asia
Paleogene mammals of Europe
Fossil taxa described in 1846
Prehistoric even-toed ungulate genera